The Living Playing Cards is a 1905 French short silent film directed by Georges Méliès.

Synopsis 
A magician enters a stage set on which a large white screen has been placed. Taking a deck of playing cards, he shows one to the camera, makes it grow larger, and finally throws it upon the screen, creating a gigantic reproduction of the card. He does the same with two face cards, a queen and king, each of which comes to life and steps out of the card. The king chases the magician off the stage, before ripping off his disguise to reveal the magician himself.

Production 
The film is based on a stage magic act performed at Méliès's theatre of illusions, the Théâtre Robert-Houdin in Paris. In the stage version, the magician was Gaston Velle, who would himself later become a director of Méliès-like trick films for Pathé Frères. In the film version, Méliès himself plays the magician. The special effects used are substitution splices and dissolves.

References

External links 
 

French black-and-white films
French silent short films
Films directed by Georges Méliès
1905 films